This section of the Timeline of United States history concern events from 1900 to 1929.

1900s

Presidency of Theodore Roosevelt
1901 – President William McKinley assassinated, Vice President Roosevelt becomes the 26th President
1901 – U.S. Steel founded by John Pierpont Morgan
1901 – Hay–Pauncefote Treaty
1901 - Louis Armstrong born
1902 – Drago Doctrine
1902 – First Rose Bowl game played
1902 – Newlands Reclamation Act
1903 – Great Train Robbery movie opens
1903 – Harley-Davidson Motor Company created
1903 – Ford Motor Company formed
1903 – First World Series
1903 – Elkins Act
1903 – Big stick ideology
1903 – Hay–Bunau-Varilla Treaty
1903 – Hay–Herrán Treaty
1903 – United States Department of Commerce and Labor created
1903 – The Wright brothers make their first powered flight in the Wright Flyer at Kitty Hawk, North Carolina
1904 – Roosevelt Corollary to Monroe Doctrine
1904 – Panama Canal Zone acquired
1904 – Louisiana Purchase Exposition, St. Louis
1904 – U.S. presidential election: Theodore Roosevelt elected president for full term; Charles W. Fairbanks elected vice president
1905 – President Roosevelt begins full term, Charles W. Fairbanks becomes Vice President
1905 – Niagara Falls conference
1905 – Industrial Workers of the World
1905 – Albert Einstein publishes his theory of relativity
1906 – Susan B. Anthony dies
1906 – Algeciras Conference
1906 – Pure Food and Drug Act and Federal Meat Inspection Act
1906 – Hepburn Act
1906 – Theodore Roosevelt negotiates Treaty of Portsmouth, receives Nobel Peace Prize

1906 – San Francisco earthquake
1907 – Oklahoma becomes a state
1907 – Gentlemen's Agreement
1907 – Coal mine explodes in Monongah, West Virginia, killing at least 361. Worst industrial accident in American history.
1908 – Ford Model T appears on the market
1908 – Root–Takahira Agreement
1908 – Federal Bureau of Investigation established
1908 – Aldrich–Vreeland Act
1908 – U.S. presidential election: William Howard Taft elected president; James S. Sherman vice president. William Jennings Bryan loses for the third and final time. 
1909 – The U.S. penny is changed to the Abraham Lincoln design

Presidency of William Howard Taft
1909 – William Howard Taft becomes the 27th President, James S. Sherman becomes Vice President
1909 – Robert Peary claims to have reached the North Pole
1909 – NAACP founded by W. E. B. Du Bois
1909 – Payne–Aldrich Tariff Act
1909 – Taft implements dollar diplomacy
1909 – Pinchot–Ballinger controversy

1910s

1910 - Jacques Cousteau is born
1910 – Mann–Elkins Act
1910 – Mann Act
1911 – Supreme Court breaks up Standard Oil
1911 – Triangle Shirtwaist Factory fire
1911 – First Indianapolis 500 is staged; Ray Harroun is the first winner
1912 – RMS Titanic sinks
1912 – New Mexico and Arizona become states
1912 – Girl Scouts of the USA was started by Juliette Gordon Low
1912 – Theodore Roosevelt shot, but not killed, while campaigning for the presidency
1912 – Vice President Sherman dies
1912 – U.S. presidential election: Woodrow Wilson elected president, Thomas R. Marshall, vice president. Roosevelt becomes the only third party candidate to come in second for well over a century.

Presidency of Woodrow Wilson
1913 – Wilson becomes the 28th President and Marshall, Vice President
1913 – Woman Suffrage Procession, a large woman suffrage parade in Washington D.C., is organized by Alice Paul and held on the eve of Wilson's inaugural
1913 – 16th Amendment, establishing an income tax
1913 – End of the Philippine–American War
1913 – The Armory Show opens in New York City introducing Modern art both American and European to the American public.
1913 – 17th Amendment, establishing the direct election of U.S. Senators.
1913 – Underwood Tariff
1913 – Henry Ford develops the modern assembly line
1914 – Mother's Day established as a national holiday
1914 – Federal Trade Commission created
1914 – Clayton Antitrust Act
1914 – ABC Powers
1914 – World War I begins when Austria–Hungary declares war on Serbia
1915 – The Birth of a Nation opens
1915 – RMS Lusitania sunk
1915 – First transcontinental telephone is hooked up
1916 – the U.S. acquires Virgin Islands
1916 – Jeannette Rankin first woman elected to U.S. congress
1916 – Louis Brandeis appointed to Supreme Court
1916 – Adamson Act
1916 – Federal Farm Loan Act
1916 – Jones Act
1916 – 1916 United States presidential election: Wilson and Marshall reelected by a mere 3,773 votes in California
1916 – Germany agrees to restrict submarine warfare
1916 – The Great Migration begins
1917 – Zimmermann Telegram
1917 – President Wilson and Vice President Marshall begin second terms
1917 – U.S. enters World War I
1917 – Espionage and Sedition Acts
1917 – Lansing–Ishii Agreement
1917 – National Hockey League formed
1917 – U.S. Virgin Islands purchased from Denmark
1917 – Temperance movement leads to prohibition laws in 29 states
1917–1919 – Silent Sentinels hold a vigil outside the White House gates in favor of women's suffrage, a nearly two–and–a–half year demonstration organized by Alice Paul and the National Woman's Party
1917–1920 – First Red Scare, marked by a widespread fear of Bolshevism and anarchism
1918 – President Wilson's Fourteen Points, which assures citizens that the Great War was being fought for a moral cause and postwar peace in Europe
1918 – Republicans win back Congress in the Midterm elections.
1918 – Armistice agreement ends World War I
1918 – Spanish flu pandemic begins
1918 – Daylight saving time is first adopted
1919 – Treaty of Versailles agreed to by victorious powers.
1919 – President Wilson has a massive stroke. First Lady Edith Wilson takes over in a "silent coup".
1919 – United States Senate rejects Treaty of Versailles and League of Nations
1919 – 18th Amendment, establishing Prohibition
1919 – Black Sox Scandal during that year's World Series, with the fallout lasting for decades
1919 – Sherwood Anderson publishes Winesburg, Ohio
1919 – Palmer Raids

1920s

1920 – 19th Amendment, grants women the right to vote
1920 – The Great Steel Strike ends
1920 – Sacco and Vanzetti arrested
1920 – First radio broadcasts, by KDKA in Pittsburgh and WWJ in Detroit
1920 – Volstead Act
1920 – Esch–Cummins Act
1920 – Economy collapses. The Depression of 1920–21 begins. 
1920 – National Football League is formed
1920 – U.S. presidential election, 1920: Warren G. Harding elected president, and Calvin Coolidge  vice president.

Presidency of Warren G. Harding
1921 – Harding becomes the 29th President and Coolidge Vice President
1921 – Washington Disarmament Conference of 1921
1921 – Emergency Quota Act
1921 - Tulsa race massacre
1921 – After refusing to sign the Treaty of Versailles and join the League of Nations, the U.S. Senate signed separate treaties with Germany, Austria, and Hungary. 
1922 – Fordney–McCumber Tariff
1922 – Lincoln Memorial is dedicated
1922 – The Nine Power Treaty
The Early 1920s – Hollywood becomes the center of the movie industry.
1923 – President Harding dies; Vice President Coolidge becomes the 30th President
1923 – Teapot Dome scandal
1923 – The Cotton Club opens in Harlem
1923 – Yankee Stadium was built
1924 – Immigration Act Basic Law
1924 – Indian Citizenship Act
1924 – J. Edgar Hoover is appointed director of the Bureau of Investigation — the predecessor to the FBI.
1924 – U.S. presidential election, 1924: Calvin Coolidge elected president for a full term, Charles G. Dawes elected vice president
1924 – The Dawes Plan
1925 – President Coolidge begins full term, Charles G. Dawes becomes Vice President
1925 – Scopes Trial, whose outcome found that the teaching of evolution in the classroom "does not violate church and state or state religion laws but instead, merely prohibits the teaching of evolution on the grounds of intellectual disagreement"
1925 – Nellie Tayloe Ross elected governor of Wyoming
1925 – WSM broadcasts the Grand Ole Opry for the first time.
1925 – Countee Cullen published a book of poems called Color.
1925 – F. Scott Fitzgerald publishes The Great Gatsby
1926 – NBC founded as the U.S.'s first major broadcast network
1926 – United States intervenes in Nicaragua
1926 – Opportunity Magazine publishes Langston Hughes' The Weary Blues
1926 – The Sun Also Rises by Ernest Hemingway is published.
1927 – Sacco and Vanzetti executed, seven years after they were convicted of murdering two men during an armed robbery in Massachusetts
1927 – Charles Lindbergh makes first trans–Atlantic flight
1927 – The Jazz Singer, the first motion picture with sound, is released
1927 – U.S. citizenship granted to inhabitants of U.S. Virgin Islands
1927 – Columbia Broadcasting System (later called CBS) was founded, and becomes the second national radio network in the U.S.
1927 – The 15,000,000th Model T rolled off the Assembly Line at Ford Motor Company.
1927 – Babe Ruth hits a record 60 home runs in a single season
1928 – Disney's Steamboat Willie opens, the first animated picture to feature Mickey Mouse
1928 – Kellogg–Briand Pact
1928 – Amelia Earhart becomes the first woman to fly across the Atlantic Ocean.
1928 - First color motion pictures are demonstrated by George Eastman
1928 – U.S. presidential election, 1928: Herbert C. Hoover elected president and Charles Curtis vice president
1929 – St. Valentine's Day Massacre
1929 - Wall Street Crash of 1929 occurs, resulting in the Great Depression.

See also
 History of the United States (1865–1918)
 History of the United States (1918–1945)

References

External links
 H-SHGAPE  discussion forum for people studying the Gilded Age and Progressive Era

1900